Max Bruno Alwin (17 June 1939 – 22 December 1995) was a Dutch rower. He competed in the double sculls event at the 1964 Summer Olympics, together with Peter Bots, and finished in eighth place.

References

1939 births
1995 deaths
Dutch male rowers
Olympic rowers of the Netherlands
Rowers at the 1964 Summer Olympics
Rowers from Amsterdam